Bagno  is a village in the administrative district of Gmina Nowe Miasto Lubawskie, within Nowe Miasto County, Warmian-Masurian Voivodeship, in northern Poland.

The village has a population of 230.

History
During the German occupation of Poland (World War II), on October 9, 1939, the Sicherheitspolizei murdered six Poles in the village, including four farmers, one teacher and one merchant (see Intelligenzaktion).

References

Bagno
Nazi war crimes in Poland